Macedonian nationalism is a general grouping of nationalist ideas and concepts among ethnic Macedonians that were first formed in the late 19th century among separatists seeking the autonomy of the region of Macedonia from the Ottoman Empire. The idea evolved during the early 20th century alongside the first expressions of ethnic nationalism among the Slavs of Macedonia. The separate Macedonian nation gained recognition after World War II when the "Socialist Republic of Macedonia" was created as part of Yugoslavia. Afterwards the Macedonian historiography has established links between the ethnic Macedonians and historical events and Bulgarian figures from the Middle Ages up to the 20th century. Following the independence of the Republic of Macedonia in the late 20th century, issues of Macedonian national identity have become contested by the country's neighbours, as some adherents to aggressive Macedonian nationalism, called Macedonism, hold more extreme beliefs such as an unbroken continuity between ancient Macedonians (essentially an ancient Greek people), and modern ethnic Macedonians (a Slavic people), and views connected to the irredentist concept of a United Macedonia, which involves territorial claims on a large portion of Greece and Bulgaria, along with smaller regions of Albania, Kosovo and Serbia.

The designation “Macedonian”

 

 

During the first half of the second millennium, the concept of Macedonia on the Balkans was associated by the Byzantines with their Macedonian province, centered around Adrianople  in modern-day Turkey. After the conquest of the Balkans by the Ottomans in the late 14th and early 15th century, the Greek name Macedonia disappeared as a geographical designation for several centuries. The background of the modern designation Macedonian can be found in the 19th century, as well as the myth of "ancient Macedonian descent" among the Orthodox Slavs in the area, adopted mainly due to Greek cultural inputs. However Greek education was not the only engine for such ideas. At that time some pan-Slavic propagandists believed the early Slavs were related to the paleo-Balkan tribes. Under these influences some intellectuals in the region developed the idea on direct link between the local Slavs, the Early Slavs and the ancient Balkan populations. 
 
In Ottoman times names as  "Lower Bulgaria" and "Lower Moesia" were used by the local Slavs to designate most of the territory of today's geographical region of Macedonia and the names Bulgaria and Moesia were identified with each other. Self-identifying as "Bulgarian" on account of their language, the local Slavs considered themselves as "Rum", i.e. members of the community of Orthodox Christians. This community was a source of identity for all the ethnic groups inside it and most people identified mostly with it. Until the middle of the 19th century, the Greeks also called the Slavs in Macedonia "Bulgarians", and regarded them predominantly as Orthodox brethren, but the rise of Bulgarian nationalism changed the Greek position. At that time the Orthodox Christian community began to degrade with the continuous identification of the religious creed with ethnic identity, while Bulgarian national activists started a debate on the establishment of their separate Orthodox church.
 
As a result, massive Greek religious and school propaganda occurred, and a process of Hellenization was implemented among the Slavic-speaking population of the area. The very name Macedonia, revived during the early 19th century after the foundation of the modern Greek state, with its Western Europe-derived obsession with Ancient Greece, was applied to the local Slavs. The idea was to stimulate the development of close ties between them and the Greeks, linking both sides to the ancient Macedonians, as a counteract against the growing Bulgarian cultural influence into the region. In 1845, for instance, the Alexander romance was published in Slavic Macedonian dialect typed with Greek letters. At the same time the Russian ethnographer Victor Grigorovich described a recent change in the title of the Greek Patriarchist bishop of Bitola: from Exarch of all Bulgaria to Exarch of all Macedonia. He also noted the unusual popularity of Alexander the Great and that it appeared to be something that was recently instilled on the local Slavs.  
 
As a consequence, since the 1850s some Slavic intellectuals from the area adopted the designation Macedonian as a regional label, and it began to gain popularity. In the 1860s, according to Petko Slaveykov, some young intellectuals from Macedonia were claiming that they are not Bulgarians, but they are rather Macedonians, descendants of the Ancient Macedonians. In a letter written to the Bulgarian Exarch in February 1874 Petko Slaveykov reports that discontent with the current situation “has given birth among local patriots to the disastrous idea of working independently on the advancement of their own local dialect and what’s more, of their own, separate Macedonian church leadership.” Nevertheless, other Macedonian intellectuals as Miladinov Brothers, continued to call their land Western Bulgaria and worried that use of the new name would imply identification with the Greek nation.

However, per Kuzman Shapkarev, as a result of Macedonists activity, in the 1870s the ancient ethnonym Macedonians was imposed on the local Slavs, and began to replace the traditional one Bulgarians. During the 1880s, after recommendation by Stojan Novaković, the Serbian government also began to support those ideas to counteract the Bulgarian influence in Macedonia, claiming the Macedonian Slavs were in fact pure Slavs (i.e. Serbian Macedonians), while the Bulgarians, unlike them, were partially a mixture of Slavs and Bulgars (i.e. Tatars). In accordance with Novaković's agenda this Serbian "Macedonism" was transformed in the 1890s, in a process of the gradual Serbianisation of the Macedonian Slavs.

By the end of the 19th century, according to Vasil Kanchov the local Bulgarians called themselves Macedonians, and the surrounding nations called them Macedonians. In the early 20th century Pavel Shatev,  witnessed this process of slow differentiation, describing people who insisted on their Bulgarian nationality, but felt themselves Macedonians above all. However a similar paradox was observed at the eve of the 20th century and afterwards, when many Bulgarians from non-Macedonian descent, involved in the Macedonian affairs, espoused Macedonian identity, and that idea undoubtedly was emancipated from the pan-Bulgarian national project. During the interwar period Bulgaria also supported to some extent the Macedonian regionalism, especially in the Kingdom Yugoslavia, to prevent the final Serbianization of the local Slavs, because the very name Macedonia was prohibited there. Ultimately the designation Macedonian, changed its status in 1944, and went from being predominantly a regional, ethnographic denomination, to a national one. However, when the anthropologist Keith Brown visited the Republic of Macedonia at the eve of the 21st century, he discovered that the local Aromanians, who also call themselves Macedonians, still label  "Bulgarians" the ethnic Macedonians, and their eastern neighbours.Keith Brown, The Past in Question: Modern Macedonia and the Uncertainties of Nation, Princeton University Press, 2003, p. 110.

Origins

In the 19th century, the region of Macedonia became the object of competition by rival nationalisms, initially Greek nationalists, Serbian nationalists and Bulgarian nationalists that each made claims about the Slavic-speaking population as being ethnically linked to their nation and thus asserted the right to seek their integration. The first assertions of Macedonian nationalism arose in the late 19th century. Early Macedonian nationalists were encouraged by several foreign governments that held interests in the region. The Serbian government came to believe that any attempt to forcibly assimilate Slavic Macedonians into Serbs in order to incorporate Macedonia would be unsuccessful, given the strong Bulgarian influence in the region. Instead, the Serbian government believed that providing support to Macedonian nationalists would stimulate opposition to incorporation into Bulgaria and favourable attitudes to Serbia. Another country that encouraged Macedonian nationalism was Austria-Hungary that sought to deny both Serbia and Bulgaria the ability to annex Macedonia, and asserted a distinct ethnic character of Slavic Macedonians. In the 1890s, Russian supporters of a Slavic Macedonian ethnicity emerged, Russian-made ethnic maps began showing a Slavic Macedonian ethnicity, and Macedonian nationalists began to move to Russia to mobilize.

The origins of the definition of an ethnic Slav Macedonian identity arose from the writings of Georgi Pulevski in the 1870s and 1880s, who identified the existence of a distinct modern "Slavic Macedonian" language that he defined as different from the other languages in that it had linguistic elements from Serbian, Bulgarian, Church Slavonic, and Albanian. Pulevski analyzed the folk histories of the Slavic Macedonian people, in which he concluded that Slavic Macedonians were ethnically linked to the people of the ancient Kingdom of Macedonia of Philip and Alexander the Great based on the claim that the ancient Macedonian language had Slavic components in it and thus the ancient Macedonians were Slavic, and modern-day Slavic Macedonians were their descendants. However, Slavic Macedonians' self-identification and nationalist loyalties remained ambiguous in the late 19th century. Pulevski for instance viewed Macedonians' identity as being a regional phenomenon (similar to Herzegovinians and Thracians). Once calling himself a "Serbian patriot", another time a "Bulgarian from the village of Galicnik", he also identified the Slavic Macedonian language as being related to the "Old Bulgarian language" as well as being a "Serbo-Albanian language". Pulevski's numerous identifications reveal the absence of a clear ethnic sense in a part of the local Slavic population.

The Internal Macedonian Revolutionary Organization (IMRO) grew up as the major Macedonian separatist organization in the 1890s, seeking the autonomy of Macedonia from the Ottoman Empire. The IMRO initially opposed being dependent on any of the neighbouring states, especially Greece and Serbia, however its relationship with Bulgaria grew very strong, and it soon became dominated by figures who supported the annexation of Macedonia into Bulgaria, though a small fraction opposed this. As a rule, the IMRO members had Bulgarian national self-identification, but the autonomist faction stimulated the development of Macedonian nationalism. It devised the slogan "Macedonia for the Macedonians" and called for a supranational Macedonia, consisting of different nationalities and eventually included in a future Balkan Federation. However, the promoters of this slogan declared their conviction that the majority of the Macedonian Christian Slav population was Bulgarian.

In the late 19th and early 20th century the international community viewed the Macedonians predominantly as a regional variety of the Bulgarians. At the end of the First World War there were very few ethnographers who agreed that a separate Macedonian nation existed. During the Paris Peace Conference of 1919, the Allies sanctioned Serbian control of Vardar Macedonia and accepted the belief that Macedonian Slavs were in fact Southern Serbs. This change in opinion can largely be attributed to the Serbian geographer Jovan Cvijić. Nevertheless, Macedonist ideas increased during the interbellum in Yugoslav Vardar Macedonia and among the left diaspora in Bulgaria, and were supported by the Comintern. During the Second World War Macedonist ideas were further developed by the Yugoslav Communist Partisans, but some researchers doubt that even at that time the Slavs from Macedonia considered themselves to be ethnically separate from the Bulgarians. The turning point for the Macedonian ethnogenesis was the creation of the Socialist Republic of Macedonia as part of the Socialist Federal Republic of Yugoslavia following World War II.Modern hatreds: the symbolic politics of ethnic war. New York: Cornell University Press. Kaufman, Stuart J. (2001), p. 193, .

History

Early and middle 19th century
With the conquest of the Balkans by the Ottomans in the late 14th century, the name of Macedonia disappeared for several centuries and was rarely displayed on geographic maps. It was rediscovered during the Renaissance by western researchers, who introduced ancient Greek geographical names in their work, although used in a rather loose manner. The modern region was not labeled "Macedonia" by the Ottomans. The name "Macedonia" gained popularity parallel to the ascendance of rival nationalism. The central and northern areas of modern Macedonia were often called "Bulgaria" or "Lower Moesia" during Ottoman rule. The name "Macedonia" was revived to mean a separate geographical region on the Balkans, this occurring in the early 19th century, after the foundation of the modern Greek state, with its Western Europe-derived obsession with the Ancient world. However, as a result of the massive Greek religious and school propaganda, a kind of Macedonization occurred among the Greek and non-Greek speaking population of the area. The name Macedonian Slavs was also introduced by the Greek clergy and teachers among the local Slavophones with an aim to stimulate the development of close ties between them and the Greeks, linking both sides to the ancient Macedonians, as a counteract against the growing Bulgarian influence there.

Late 19th and early 20th century

The first attempts for creation of the Macedonian ethnicityLoring Danforth, The Macedonian Conflict: Ethnic Nationalism in a Transnational World, Princeton University Press, December 1995, p. 63: "Finally, Krste Misirkov, who had clearly developed a strong sense of his own personal national identity as a Macedonian and who outspokenly and unambiguously called for Macedonian linguistic and national separatism, acknowledged that a 'Macedonian' national identity was a relatively recent historical development."Throughout this article, the term "Macedonian" will refer to ethnic Macedonians. There are many other uses of the term, and comprehensive coverage of this topic may be found in the article Macedonia (terminology). can be said to have begun in the late 19th and early 20th century.Social cleavages and national "awakening" in Ottoman Macedonia by Basil C. Gounaris, East European Quarterly 29 (1995), 409–426  This was the time of the first expressions of Macedonism by limited groups of intellectuals in Belgrade, Sofia, Thessaloniki and St. Petersburg. However, up until the 20th century and beyond, the majority of the Slavic-speaking population of the region was identified as Macedono-Bulgarian or simply as Bulgarian and after 1870 joined the Bulgarian Exarchate. Although he was appointed Bulgarian metropolitan bishop, in 1891 Theodosius of Skopje attempted to restore the Archbishopric of Ohrid as an autonomous Macedonian church, but his idea failed.Although he was named Bulgarian metropolitan bishop in Skopje, in 1890–1892 Gologanov tried to establish a separate Macedonian Church, an activity that resulted in his dismissal and temporary marginalization. Thus after his short period as an early Macedonian national ideologist, Gologanov again became a Bulgarian bishop, as well as a writer and a member of the Bulgarian Academy of Sciences. He contributed significantly to the construction of the image of Macedonia as cradle of the Bulgarian National Revival. For more see: Roumen Daskalov, Alexander Vezenkov as ed., Entangled Histories of the Balkans - Volume Three: Shared Pasts, Disputed Legacies, BRILL, 2015, p. 451. Some authors consider that at that time, labels reflecting collective identity, such as "Bulgarian", changed into national labels from being broad terms that were without political significance. According to Nick Antonovski, presenting a pro-Macedonian view, the 19th century foreign observers considered Macedonian Slavs to be Bulgarians - a view influenced by the Ottoman millet system, even though the term Bulgarian was a broad label that had no political significance, meaning nothing more than peasant. Per John Van Antwerp Fine Jr. until the late 19th century those Macedonian Slavs who had developed an ethnic identity believed they were Bulgarians.

However the designation 'Bulgarian' also referred to all the Slavs living in Rumelia. Per Raymond Detrez "Indeed, until the 1860s, as there are no documents or inscriptions mentioning the Macedonians as a separate ethnic group, all Slavs in Macedonia used to call themselves Bulgarians". The semi-official term Bulgarian Millet, was used by the Ottoman Sultan for the first time in 1847, and was his tacit consent to a more ethno-linguistic definition of the Bulgarians as a separate ethic group. Officially as a separate Millet were recognized the Bulgarian Uniates in 1860, and then in 1870 the Bulgarian Exarchists. With the rise of nationalism in the Ottoman Empire then, the classical Ottoman millet system began to degrade with the continuous identification of the religious creed with ethnic identity. In this way, in the struggle for recognition of a separate national Church, the modern Bulgarian nation was created,The Making of a Nation in the Balkans: Historiography of the Bulgarian Revival, Rumen Daskalov, Central European University Press, 2004, p. 1. and the religious affiliation became a consequence of national allegiance. 

On the eve of the 20th century the Internal Macedonian-Adrianople Revolutionary Organization (IMARO) tried to unite all unsatisfied elements in the Ottoman Europe and struggled for political autonomy in the regions of Macedonia and Adrianople Thrace. But this manifestation of political separatism by the IMARO was a phenomenon without ethnic affiliation and the Bulgarian ethnic provenance of the revolutionaries can not be put under question.

Balkan Wars and First World War
During the Balkan Wars and the First World War the area was exchanged several times between Bulgaria and Serbia. The IMARO supported the Bulgarian army and authorities when they took temporary control over Vardar Macedonia. On the other hand, Serbian authorities put pressure on local people to declare themselves Serbs: they disbanded local governments, established by IMARO in Ohrid, Veles and other cities and persecuted Bulgarian priests and teachers, forcing them to flee and replacing them with Serbians. Serbian troops enforced a policy of disarming the local militia, accompanied by beatings and threats. During this period the political autonomism was abandoned as tactics and annexationist positions were supported, aiming eventual incorporation of the area into Bulgaria.

Interwar period and WWII
After the WWI, in Serbian Macedonia any manifestations of Bulgarian nationhood were suppressed. Even in the so-called Western Outlands ceded by Bulgaria in 1920 Bulgarian identification was prohibited. The Bulgarian notes to the League of Nations, consented to recognize a Bulgarian minority in Yugoslavia were rejected. The members of the Council of the League assumed that the existence of some Bulgarian minority there was possible, however, they were determined to keep Yugoslavia and were aware that any exercise of revisionism, would open an uncontrollable wave of demands, turning the Balkans into a battlefield.  Belgrade was suspicious of the recognition of any Bulgarian minority and was annoyed this would hinder its policy of forced “Serbianisation”. It blocked such recognition in neighboring Greece and Albania, through the failed ratifications of the Politis–Kalfov Protocol in 1924 and the Albanian-Bulgarian Protocol (1932).

During the interwar period in Vardar Macedonia, part of the young locals repressed by the Serbs attempted at a separate way of ethnic development. In 1934 the Comintern issued a resolution about the recognition of a separate Macedonian ethnicity. However, the existence of considerable Macedonian national consciousness prior to the 1940s is disputed.Stephen Palmer, Robert King, Yugoslav Communism and the Macedonian question, Hamden, CT Archon Books, 1971, pp. 199–200 
This confusion is illustrated by Robert Newman in 1935, who recounts discovering in a village in Vardar Macedonia two brothers, one who considered himself a Serb, and the other a Bulgarian. In another village he met a man who had been "a Macedonian peasant all his life" but who had been at various times called a Turk, a Serb and a Bulgarian.  During the Second World War the area was annexed by Bulgaria and anti-Serbian and pro-Bulgarian feelings among the local population prevailed. Because of that Vardar Macedonia remained the only region where Yugoslav communist leader Josip Broz Tito had not developed a strong partisan movement in 1941. The new provinces were quickly staffed with officials from Bulgaria proper who behaved with typical official arrogance to the local inhabitants. The communists' power started growing only in 1943 with the capitulation of Italy and the Soviet victories over Nazi Germany. To improve the situation in the area Tito ordered the establishment of the Communist Party of Macedonia in March 1943 and the second AVNOJ congress on 29 November 1943 did recognise the Macedonian nation as separate entity. As a result, the resistance movement grew. However, by the end of the war, the Bulgarophile sentiments were still distinguishable and the Macedonian national consciousness hardly existed beyond a general conviction gained from bitter experience, that rule from Sofia was as unpalatable as that from Belgrade.

Post-World War II

After 1944 the People's Republic of Bulgaria and the Socialist Federal Republic of Yugoslavia began a policy of making Macedonia into the connecting link for the establishment of a future Balkan Federative Republic and stimulating the development of a distinct Slav Macedonian consciousness. The region received the status of a constituent republic within Yugoslavia and in 1945 a separate Macedonian language was codified. The population was proclaimed to be ethnic Macedonian, a nationality different from both Serbs and Bulgarians. With the proclamation of the Socialist Republic of Macedonia as part of the Yugoslav federation, the new authorities also enforced measures that would overcome the pro-Bulgarian feeling among parts of its population.  On the other hand, the Yugoslav authorities forcibly suppressed the ideologists of an independent Macedonian country. The Greek communists, similar to their fraternal parties in Bulgaria and Yugoslavia, had already been influenced by the Comintern and were the only political party in Greece to recognize Macedonian national identity. However, the situation deteriorated after they lost the Greek Civil War. Thousands of Aegean Macedonians were expelled and fled to the newly established Socialist Republic of Macedonia, while thousands of more children took refuge in other Eastern Bloc countries.

Post-Informbiro period and Bulgarophobia

At the end of the 1950s the Bulgarian Communist Party repealed its previous decision and adopted a position denying the existence of a Macedonian ethnicity. As a result, the Bulgarophobia in Macedonia increased almost to the level of State ideology. This put an end to the idea of a Balkan Communist Federation. During the post-Informbiro period, a separate Macedonian Orthodox Church was established, splitting off from the Serbian Orthodox Church in 1967. The encouragement and evolution of the culture of the Republic of Macedonia has had a far greater and more permanent impact on Macedonian nationalism than has any other aspect of Yugoslav policy. While the development of national music, films and graphic arts had been encouraged in the Republic of Macedonia, the greatest cultural effect came from the codification of the Macedonian language and literature, the new Macedonian national interpretation of history and the establishment of a Macedonian Orthodox Church. Meanwhile, the Yugoslav historiography borrowed certain parts of the histories of its neighboring states in order to construct the Macedonian identity, having reached not only the times of medieval Bulgaria, but even as far back as Alexander the Great. In 1969, the first History of the Macedonian nation was published. Most Macedonians' attitude to Communist Yugoslavia, where they were recognized as a distinct nation for the first time, became positive. The Macedonian Communist elites were traditionally more pro-Serb and pro-Yugoslav than those in the rest of the Yugoslav Republics.

After the Second World War, Macedonian and Serbian scholars usually defined the ancient local tribes in the area of the Central Balkans as Daco-Moesian. Previously these entities were traditionally regarded in Yugoslavia as Illyrian, in accordance with the romantic early-20th-century interests in the Illyrian movement. At first, the Daco-Moesian tribes were separated through linguistic research. Later, Yugoslav archaeologists and historians came to an agreement that Daco-Moesians should be located in the areas of modern-day Serbia and North Macedonia. The most popular Daco-Moesian tribes described in Yugoslav literature were the Triballians, the Dardanians and the Paeonians. The leading research goal in the Republic of Macedonia during Yugoslav times was the establishment of some kind of Paionian identity and to separate it from the western "Illyrian" and the eastern "Thracian" entities. The idea of Paionian identity was constructed to conceptualize that Vardar Macedonia was neither Illyrian nor Thracian, favouring a more complex division, contrary to scientific claims about strict Thraco-Illyrian Balkan separation in neighbouring Bulgaria and Albania. Yugoslav Macedonian historiography argued also that the plausible link between the Slav Macedonians and their ancient namesakes was, at best, accidental.

Post-independence period and Antiquisation

On September 8, 1991, the Socialist Republic of Macedonia held a referendum that established its independence from Yugoslavia. With the fall of Communism, the breakup of Yugoslavia and the consequent lack of a Great power in the region, the Republic of Macedonia came into permanent conflicts with its neighbors. Bulgaria contested its national identity and language, Greece contested its name and symbols, and Serbia its religious identity. On the other hand, the ethnic Albanians in the country insisted on being recognised as a nation, equal to the ethnic Macedonians. As a response, a more assertive and uncompromising form of Macedonian nationalism emerged.Floudas, Demetrius Andreas;   At that time the concept of ancient Paionian identity was changed to a kind of mixed Paionian-Macedonian identity which was later transformed to a separate ancient Macedonian identity, establishing a direct link to the modern ethnic Macedonians. This phenomenon is called "ancient Macedonism", or "Antiquisation" ("Antikvizatzija", "антиквизација"). Its supporters claim that the ethnic Macedonians are not descendants of the Slavs only, but of the ancient Macedonians too, who, according to them, were not Greeks. Antiquisation is the policy which the nationalisticHugh Poulton, Who are the Macedonians?, Hurst & Company, 2000Christopher K. Lamont, International Criminal Justice and the Politics of Compliance, Ashgate, 2010Imogen Bell, Central and South-Eastern Europe 2004, Routledge ruling party VMRO-DPMNE pursued after coming to power in 2006, as a way of putting pressure on Greece, as well as for the purposes of domestic identity-building.Stephanie Herold, Benjamin Langer, Julia Lechler, Reading the City: Urban Space and Memory in Skopje, Technischen Universität Berlin, Taschenbuch, 2011, p. 43 Antiquisation is also spreading due to a very intensive lobbying of the Macedonian diaspora from the US, Canada, Germany and Australia, Some members of the Macedonian diaspora even believe, without basis, that certain modern historians, namely Ernst Badian, Peter Green, and Eugene Borza, possess a pro-Macedonian bias in the Macedonian-Greek conflict. 

Similar parahistorical myths connecting the Slavs and Paleo-Balkan peoples were characteristic for Ottoman Bulgaria during the late 18th and the 19th century and later arrose in Ottoman Macedonia.Per Tchavdar Marinov a phenomenon of a specific “local Macedonian” patriotism, was described at the turn of the twentieth century by foreign observers. They likewise noted the legend that Alexander the Great and Aristotle were “Bulgarians.” Obviously, by the late Ottoman period, the ancient glory of the region of Macedonia was exploited for self-legitimation by groups with different loyalties—Greek as well as Bulgarian. It was also generating a new identity that, during that period, was still not necessarily exclusive vis-à-vis Greek or Bulgarian national belonging. Marinov claims that such people, although Bulgarians by national identification and Macedonian by political conviction, began to promote rarely the prognostics of some different ethnicity, which after the First World War were transformed into definitive Macedonian nationalism. For more see: Tchavdar Marinov, "Famous Macedonia, the Land of Alexander: Macedonian Identity at the Crossroads of Greek, Bulgarian and Serbian Nationalism", In: Entangled Histories of the Balkans - Volume One, pp: 293–294; 304. Practically, until the 1940s Bulgarian academic circles and Bulgarian volk history spread the same views when fighting Greek claims about the Greek origins of the ancient Macedonians. 

As part of this policy, statues of Alexander the Great and Philip II of Macedon have been built in several cities across the country. In 2011, a massive, 22-meter-tall statue of Alexander the Great (called "Warrior on a horse" because of the dispute with Greece) was inaugurated in Macedonia Square in Skopje, as part of the Skopje 2014 remodelling of the city. An even larger statue of Philip II is also constructed at the other end of the square. A triumphal arch named Porta Macedonia, constructed in the same square, featuring images of historical figures including Alexander the Great, caused the Greek Foreign Ministry to lodge an official complaint to authorities in the Republic of Macedonia. Statues of Alexander are also on display in the town squares of Prilep and Štip, while a statue to Philip II of Macedon was recently built in Bitola. Additionally, many pieces of public infrastructure, such as airports, highways, and stadiums have been named after ancient historical figures or entities. Skopje's airport was renamed "Alexander the Great Airport" and features antique objects moved from Skopje's archeological museum. One of Skopje's main squares has been renamed Pella Square (after Pella, the capital of the ancient kingdom of Macedon), while the main highway to Greece has been renamed to "Alexander of Macedon" and Skopje's largest stadium has been renamed "Philip II Arena". These actions are seen as deliberate provocations in neighboring Greece, exacerbating the dispute and further stalling Macedonia's EU and NATO applications. In 2008 a visit by Hunza Prince was organized in the Republic of Macedonia. The Hunza people of Northern Pakistan were proclaimed as direct descendants of the Alexandrian army and as people who are most closely related to the ethnic Macedonians. The Hunza delegation led by Mir Ghazanfar Ali Khan was welcomed at the Skopje Airport by the country's prime minister Nikola Gruevski, the head of the Macedonian Orthodox Church Archbishop Stephen and the mayor of Skopje, Trifun Kostovski.

Such antiquization is facing criticism by academics as it demonstrates feebleness of archaeology and of other historical disciplines in public discourse, as well as a danger of marginalization. The policy has also attracted criticism domestically, by ethnic Macedonians within the country, who see it as dangerously dividing the country between those who identify with classical antiquity and those who identify with the country's Slavic culture.Academic G. Stardelov and first President of the Republic of Macedonia Kiro Gligorov against antiquisation, on YouTube Ethnic Albanians in North Macedonia see it as an attempt to marginalize them and exclude them from the national narrative. The policy, which also claims as ethnic Macedonians figures considered national heroes in Bulgaria, such as Dame Gruev and Gotse Delchev, has also drawn criticism from Bulgaria. Foreign diplomats had warned that the policy reduced international sympathy for the Republic of Macedonia in the then-naming dispute with Greece.

The background of this antiquization can be found in the 19th century and the myth of ancient descent among Orthodox Slavic-speakers in Macedonia. It was adopted partially due to Greek cultural inputs. This idea was also included in the national mythology during the post-WWII Yugoslavia. An additional factor for its preservation has been the influence of the Macedonian Diaspora. Contemporary antiquization has been revived as an efficient tool for political mobilization and has been reinforced by the VMRO-DPMNE. For example, in 2009 the Macedonian Radio-Television aired a video named "Macedonian prayer" in which the Christian God was presented calling the people of North Macedonia "the oldest nation on Earth" and "progenitors of the white race", who are described as "Macedonoids", in opposition to Negroids and Mongoloids.
This ultra-nationalism accompanied by the emphasizing of North Macedonia's ancient roots has raised concerns internationally about growing a kind of authoritarianism by the governing party. There have also been attempts at scientific claims about ancient nationhood, but they have had a negative impact on the international position of the country. On the other hand, there is still strong Yugonostalgia among the ethnic Macedonian population, that has swept also over other ex-Yugoslav states.

Macedonian nationalism also has support among high-ranking diplomats of North Macedonia who are serving abroad, and this continues to affect the relations with neighbors, especially Greece. In August 2017, the Consul of the Republic of Macedonia to Canada attended a nationalist Macedonian event in Toronto and delivered a speech against the backdrop of an irredentist map of Greater Macedonia. This has triggered strong protests from the Greek side, which regards this as a sign that irredentism remains the dominant state ideology and everyday political practice in the neighboring country. Following strong diplomatic protests, however, the Foreign Ministry of the Republic of Macedonia condemned the incident and recalled its diplomat back to Skopje for consultations.

Before the Balkan Wars Macedonist ideas were shared by a limited circle of intellectuals. They grew in significance during the interbellum, both in Vardar Macedonia and among the left-leaning diaspora in Bulgaria, and were endorsed by the Comintern. During the Second World War, these ideas were supported by the Communist Partisans, who founded the Yugoslav Macedonian Republic in 1944. Following the Second World War, Macedonism became the basis of Yugoslav Macedonia's state ideology, aimed at transforming the Slavic and, to a certain extent, non-Slavic parts of its population into ethnic Macedonians. This state policy is still current in today's Republic of North Macedonia, where it was developed in several directions. One of them maintains the connection of the modern ethnic Macedonians with the ancient Macedonians, rather than with the South Slavs, while others have sought to incorporate into the national pantheon the right-wing Internal Macedonian Revolutionary Organization (IMRO) activists, previously dismissed as Bulgarophiles.

The term is occasionally used in an apologetic sense by some Macedonian authors,Џамбазовски, Климент. Стоjан Новаковић и Македонизам, Историјски часопис, 1963–1965, књига XIV–XV, с. 133–156 but has also faced strong criticism from moderate political views in North Macedonia and international scholars."Macedonia was also an attempt at a multicultural society. Here the fragments are just about holding together, although the cement that binds them is an unreliable mixture of propaganda and myth. The Macedonian language has been created, some rather misty history involving Tsar Samuel, probably a Bulgarian, and Alexander the Great, almost certainly a Greek, has been invented, and the name Macedonia has been adopted. Do we destroy these myths or live with them? Apparently these radical Slavic factions decided to live with their myths and lies for the constant amusement of the rest of the world!..." T.J. Winnifrith, Shattered Eagles, Balkan Fragments, Duckworth, 1995 Additionally the official website of the Macedonian Encyclopedia that is published by the Macedonian Academy of Sciences and Arts uses the word 'Macedonism' as its domain name.

The term is used in Bulgaria in an insulting and derogatory manner, to discredit the development of Macedonian nationalism during the 19th and 20th centuries. The term is widely seen as a Greater Serbian aspiration, aiming to split the Bulgarian people on anti-Bulgarian grounds. The term is first believed to have been used in a derogatory manner by Petko Slaveykov in 1871, when he dismissed Macedonian nationalists as "Macedonists", who he regarded a misguided (sic): Grecomans. 

Macedonism as an ethno-political conception
The roots of the concept were first developed in the second half of the 19th century, in the context of Greek, Bulgarian and Serbian initiatives to take control over the region of Macedonia, which was at that time ruled by the Ottoman Empire. It was originally used in a contemptuous manner to refer to Slav Macedonians, who believed they constituted a distinct ethnic group, separate from their neighbours. The first to use the term "Macedonist" was the Bulgarian author Petko Slaveykov, who coined the term in his article "The Macedonian Question", published in the newspaper Makedoniya in 1871. However, he pointed out that he had heard for the first time of such ideas as early as 10 years prior, i.e. around 1860. Slaveykov sharply criticised those Macedonians espousing such views, as they had never shown a substantial basis for their attitudes, calling them "Macedonists". Nevertheless, those accused of Slaveikov as Macedonists were representative of the movement aiming at the construction of the Bulgarian standard literary language primarily on the Macedonian dialects, such as Kuzman Shapkarev, Dimitar Makedonski and Veniamin Machukovski. Another early recorded use of the term "Macedonism" is found in a report by the Serbian politician Stojan Novaković from 1887. He proposed to employ the Macedonistic ideology as a means to counteract the Bulgarian influence in Macedonia, thereby promoting Serbian interests in the region. Novaković's diplomatic activity in Istanbul and St. Petersburg played a significant role in the realization of his ideas, especially through the "Association of Serbo-Macedonians" formed by him in Istanbul and through his support for the Macedonian Scientific and Literary Society in St. Petersburg. The geopolitics of the Serbs evidently played a crucial role in the ethnogenesis by promoting a separate Macedonian consciousness at the expense of the Bulgarians (it is worth mentioning that 19th century Serbian propaganda mostly adhered to direct Serbianization, including post-WWI policy of Belgrade in Vardar Macedonia). In 1888 the Macedono-Bulgarian ethnographer Kuzman Shapkarev noted that, as a result of this activity, a strange, ancient ethnonym "Makedonci" (Macedonians) was imposed 10–15 years prior by outside intellectuals, introduced with a "cunning aim" to replace the traditional "Bugari" (Bulgarians).

In 1892, Georgi Pulevski completed the first "Slavic-Macedonian General History", with a manuscript of over 1,700 pages. According to the book, the ancient Macedonians were Slavic people and the Macedonian Slavs were native to the Balkans, in contrast of the Bulgarians and the Serbs, who came there centuries later. The root of such indigenous mixture of Illyrism and Pan-Slavism can be seen in "Concise history of the Slav Bulgarian People" (1792), written by Spyridon Gabrovski, whose original manuscript was found in 1868 by the Russian scientist Alexander Hilferding on his journey in Macedonia. Gabrovski tried to establish a link between the Bulgaro-Macedonians from one side, and the Illyrians and the ancient Macedonians from another, who he regarded also Slavs. The main agenda of this story about the mythical Bulgaro-Illyro-Macedonians was to assert that the Macedonian and Bulgarian Slavs were among the indigenous inhabitants of the Balkans.

Other proponents of the Macedonist ideas in the early 20th century were two Serbian scholars, the geographer Jovan Cvijić and the linguist Aleksandar Belić. They claimed the Slavs of Macedonia were "Macedonian Slavs", an amorphous Slavic mass that was neither Bulgarian, nor Serbian. Cvijić further argued that the traditional ethnonym Bugari (Bulgarians) used by the Slavic population of Macedonia to refer to themselves actually meant only rayah, and in no case affiliations to the Bulgarian ethnicity. In his ethnographic studies of the Balkan Slavs, Cvijic devised a "Central Type" (Slav Macedonians and Torlaks), dissimilar at the same time to the "Dinaric Type" (the principal "Serb" ethnographic variant) and the "East Balkan Type" (representing the Bulgarians, but excluding even Western Bulgaria). The true Bulgarians belonged only to the "East Balkan Type" and were a mixture of Slavs, "Turanian" groups (Bulgars, Cumans, and Turks) and Vlachs, and as such, were different from the other South Slavs in their ethnic composition. More importantly, their national character was decidedly un-Slavic. Bulgarians were industrious and coarse. They were a people without imagination and therefore necessarily without art and culture. This caricature of the Bulgarians permitted their clear differentiation from the "Central Type," within which Cvijic included Macedonian Slavs, western Bulgarians (Shopi), and Torlaks, a type that was eminently Slavic (i.e. old-Serbian) and therefore non-Bulgarian. Nowadays, these outdated Serbian views have been propagandized by some contemporary Macedonian scholars and politicians.Проф. Драги Георгиев: Да признаем, че е имало и фалшифициране - вместо "българин" са писали "македонец"- това е истината. 21.03.2020 Factor.bg.

Some panslavic ideologists in Russia, former supporter of Greater Bulgaria, also adopted these ideas as opposing Bulgaria's Russophobic policy at the beginning of the 20th century, as for example Alexandr Rittikh and Aleksandr Amfiteatrov. At the beginning of the 20th century, the continued Serbian propaganda efforts had managed to firmly entrench the concept of the Macedonian Slavs in European public opinion and the name was used almost as frequently as Bulgarians. Simultaneously, the proponents of the Greek Struggle for Macedonia, such as Germanos Karavangelis, openly popularized the Hellenic idea about a direct link between the local Slavs and the ancient Macedonians. Nevertheless, in 1914 the Carnegie Council for Ethics in International Affairs report states that the Serbs and Greeks classified the Slavs of Macedonia as a distinct ethnic group "Macedonians Slavs" for political purposes and to conceal the existence of Bulgarians in the area. However, after the Balkan Wars (1912–1913) Ottoman Macedonia was mostly divided between Greece and Serbia, which began a process of Hellenization and Serbianisation of the Slavic population and led in general to a cease in the use of this term in both countries.

On the other hand, Serbian and Bulgarian left-wing intellectuals envisioned in the early 20th century some sort of "Balkan confederation" including Macedonia, should the Austro-Hungarian Empire and Ottoman Empire dissolve. This view was accepted from the Socialist International. In 1910, the First Balkan Socialist Conference was held in Belgrade, then within the Kingdom of Serbia. The main platform at the first conference was the call for a solution to the Macedonian Question. The creation of a Balkan Socialist Federation was proposed, in which Macedonia would be a constituent state. In 1915, after the Balkan Wars had concluded, the Balkan Socialist Conference in Bucharest agreed to create a Balkan Socialist Federation, and that divided from the "imperialists" Macedonia would be united into its framework. This ideology later found fruition with the support of the Soviet Union as a project of the Yugoslav communist federation. Various declarations were made during the 1920s and 1930s seeing the official adoption of Macedonism by the Comintern. In turn declarations were made by the Greek, Yugoslav and Bulgarian communist parties, as they agreed on its adoption as their official policy for the region. Also, the demise of the IMRO and its ideology for much of the interwar period led a part of the young local intellectuals in Vardar Macedonia, regarded at that time as Serbs, to find a solution in the ideology of Macedonism. This issue was supported during the Second World War by the Communist Resistance and in 1944 the wartime Communist leader Josip Broz Tito proclaimed the People's Republic of Macedonia as part of the Yugoslav Federation, thus partially fulfilling the Comintern's pre-war policy. He was supported by the Bulgarian leader from Macedonian descent and former General Secretary of the Comintern Georgi Dimitrov, in anticipation of an ultimately failed incorporation of the Bulgarian part of Macedonia (Pirin Macedonia) into the People's Republic of Macedonia, and of Bulgaria itself into Communist Yugoslavia.

Early adherents
The first Macedonian nationalists appeared in the late 19th and early 20th century outside Macedonia. At different points in their lives, most of them expressed conflicting statements about the ethnicity of the Slavs living in Macedonia, including their own nationality. They formed their pro-Macedonian conceptions after contacts with some panslavic circles in Serbia and Russia. The lack of diverse ethnic motivations seems to be confirmed by the fact that in their works they often used the designations Bulgaro-Macedonians, Macedonian Bulgarians and Macedonian Slavs in order to name their compatriots. Representatives of this circle were Georgi Pulevski, Theodosius of Skopje, Krste Misirkov, Stefan Dedov, Atanas Razdolov, Dimitrija Chupovski and others. Nearly all of them died in Bulgaria. Most of the next wave Macedonists were left-wing politicians, who changed their ethnic affiliations from Bulgarian to Macedonian during the 1930s, after the recognition of the Macedonian ethnicity by the Comintern, as for example Dimitar Vlahov, Pavel Shatev, Panko Brashnarov, Venko Markovski, Georgi Pirinski, Sr. and others. Such Macedonian activists, who came from the Internal Macedonian Revolutionary Organization (United) and the Bulgarian Communist Party never managed to get rid of their pro-Bulgarian bias.

Contemporary ideas

Among the views and opinions that are often perceived as representative of Macedonian nationalism and criticised as parts of "Macedonism" by those who use the term are the following:

The notion of unbroken racial, linguistic and cultural continuity between the modern ethnic Macedonians and a part of the ancient autochthonous peoples of the region, in particular the ancient Macedonians; (see: Ancient history of North Macedonia)
The idea that there is a fundamental ethnogenetic distinction between Macedonians on one side and Bulgarians on the other; (see: Ethno-genetic origins of the South-Slavic people.)
The opinion that the term Bulgarians used in Medieval and Ottoman Macedonia meant in fact common peasants or Christian Slavs, but had no affiliations to the Bulgarian ethnicity. (see: Macedonian Bulgarians)
Irredentist political views about the neighbouring regions of Greek Macedonia ("Aegean Macedonia") and parts of southwest Bulgaria ("Pirin Macedonia") and about the existence of significant ethnic Macedonian minorities in these areas, connected to the irredentist concept of a United Macedonia.

The belief that the medieval migration of Slavs is a fictional concept coined by Communist Yugoslavia and that no such migration in the Balkans occurred; (see: South Slavs)
 The denial of any presence of Serbs in Ottoman Macedonia until 1913; (see: Serbs in Macedonia)
 The denial of the existence of a Bulgarian minority in Albania; (see: Bulgarians in Albania)
The opinion that an ethnogenetic connection exists between the Macedonians and the Hunza people, going back to the time of Alexander the Great.
The belief that North Macedonia's neighbours have organized a huge propaganda effort across the world, containing false history and portraying a wrong picture about its people as a young nation, although the Macedonians are in fact the forefathers of the modern Europeans. (see: Foreign relations of North Macedonia)
The idea that the internationally accepted term Hellenism is wrong and has to be replaced with  Macedonism'', which is more correct in an historical aspect.

Other, related areas of Macedonian–Bulgarian national polemics relate to:
 The presence of the Bulgars in Medieval Macedonia and the lack of ethnogenetic connection to today's Macedonians in contrast to the Bulgarians; (see Kouber)
 The ethnic character of various medieval historical figures and entities, including the saints Cyril and Methodius, the medieval Tsar Samuil and his Empire, and the medieval Archbishopric of Ohrid;
 The historical role of the Bulgarian Exarchate and the ethnic character of the Internal Macedonian Revolutionary Organization;
The historical role of various Macedonian insurgent movements during Ottoman rule (see Ilinden Uprising) and during the Bulgarian occupation of Macedonia in World War II; (see Communist resistance in Vardar Macedonia)
The opinion that a separate Macedonian nationhood and ethnicity are an artificial product, result of the Serbian propaganda during the 19th and the Comintern policy during the 20th century; (see: Balkan Communist Federation)
The belief that the Macedonians constitute a regional ethnographic subgroup of the Bulgarian people and the Macedonian language is a dialect of Bulgarian. (see Macedonian Bulgarians)

See also

 Macedonia (terminology)
 United Macedonia
 World Macedonian Congress
 Macedonian Question
 History of the Macedonians (ethnic group)
 Demographic history of Macedonia
 Rise of nationalism under the Ottoman Empire
 Albanian nationalism in North Macedonia

References and notes

 
Nationalism
History of North Macedonia